The British undergraduate degree classification system is a grading structure for undergraduate degrees or bachelor's degrees and integrated master's degrees in the United Kingdom. The system has been applied (sometimes with significant variations) in other countries and regions.

History 
The classification system as currently used in the United Kingdom was developed in 1918. Honours were then a means to recognise individuals who demonstrated depth of knowledge or originality, as opposed to relative achievement in examination conditions.

Concern exists about possible grade inflation. It is claimed that academics are under increasing pressure from administrators to award students good marks and grades with little regard for those students' actual abilities, in order to maintain their league table rankings. The percentage of graduates who receive a First (First Class Honours) has grown from 7% in 1997 to 26% in 2017, with the rate of growth sharply accelerating toward the end of this period. A 2018 study by the UK Standing Committee for Quality Assessment concluded that improvements in faculty skill and student motivation are only two of many factors driving average grades upward, that grade inflation is real, that the British undergraduate degree classifications will become less useful to students and employers, and that inflation will undermine public confidence in the overall value of higher education. Students already believe that a First or upper Second, by itself, is no longer sufficient to secure a good job, and that they need to engage in extra-curricular activities to build their CV.

Degree classification 
A bachelor's degree can be an honours degree (bachelor's with honours) or an ordinary degree (bachelor's without honours). Honours degrees are classified, usually based on a weighted average (with higher weight given to marks in the later years of the course, and often zero weight to those in the first year) of the marks gained in exams and other assessments. Grade boundaries can vary by institution, but typical values are given below.
 First Class Honours (1st, 1 or I) – typically 70% or higher
 Second Class Honours;
 Upper division (2:1, 2i or II-1) – typically 60–69%
 Lower division (2:2, 2ii or II-2) – typically 50–59%
 Third Class Honours (3rd, 3 or III) – typically 40–49%

Students who do not achieve honours may be awarded an ordinary degree, sometimes known as a 'pass'. Ordinary degrees, and other exit awards such as the Diploma of Higher Education (DipHE; for completing the first two years of a degree course) and Certificate of Higher Education (CertHE; for completing the first year of a degree course), may be unclassified (pass/fail) or, particularly in Scotland where the ordinary degree is offered as a qualification in its own right, classified into pass, merit and distinction.

Integrated master's degrees are usually classified with honours in the same way as a bachelor's honours degree, although some integrated master's degrees are classified like postgraduate taught master's degrees or foundation degrees into:
 Distinction – typically 70% and higher
 Merit – typically 60–69%
 Pass – typically 50–59%.

At most institutions, the system allows a small amount of discretion. A candidate may be elevated to the next degree class if his or her average marks are close to (or the median of their weighted marks achieves) the higher class, and if they have submitted several pieces of work worthy of the higher class.  However, even students with a high average mark may be unable to take honours if they have failed part of the course and so have insufficient credits.

In England, Wales and Northern Ireland, a bachelor's degree with honours normally takes three years of full-time study and usually requires 360 credits, of which at least 90 are at level 6 (final year of a bachelor's degree) level, while an ordinary bachelor's degree normally requires 300 credits, of which 60 are at level 6. In Scotland, the honours bachelor's degree takes four years and requires 480 credits with a minimum of 90 at level 10 of the Scottish framework (last year of the honours degree) and 90 at level 9 (penultimate year), while the ordinary degree takes three years and requires 360 credits with a minimum of 60 at level 9 (last year of the ordinary degree).

In Scotland, it is possible to start university a year younger than in the rest of the United Kingdom, as the Scottish Higher exams are often taken at age 16 or 17 (as opposed to 18), so Scottish students often end a four-year course at the same age as a student from elsewhere in the UK taking a three-year course, assuming no gap years or students skipping the first year (direct entry to 2nd year).

When a candidate is awarded a degree with honours, '(Hons)' may be suffixed to their designatory letters – for example, BA (Hons), BSc (Hons), BMus (Hons), MA (Hons). An MA (Hons) would generally indicate a degree award from certain Scottish universities (c.f. Scottish MA) and is at the same level as a bachelor's degree.

Distribution of classes
The Higher Education Statistics Agency (HESA) has published the number of degrees awarded with different classifications since 1994–1995. The relative proportions of different classes have changed over this period, with increasing numbers of students being awarded higher honours. The table below shows the percentage of classified degrees (i.e., not including fails or unclassified degrees such as MBBS) in each class at five-year intervals; note that HESA stopped giving statistics separately for third class honours and pass degree after 2003 and that a small number of undivided second class honours degrees (shown under "other" along with "unknown", which makes up the bulk of this category) were awarded up to 1996.

First Class Honours

First Class Honours, referred to as a 'first', is the highest honours classification and indicates high academic achievement.  Historically, First Class Honours were uncommon, but as of 2019 are awarded to nearly thirty percent of graduates from British universities. The increase is said by some commentators to be due to student-demanded grade inflation rather than the quality of students or improvements to their education.

In the early 1990s, First Class Honours went to about 7% of graduates, or about one student in 15. The percentages of graduates achieving a First vary greatly by university and course studied. Students of law are least likely to gain a first, while students of mathematical sciences are most likely to gain a first. 

A first class honours degree is sometimes colloquially known (in rhyming slang) as a Geoff Hurst (First) after the English 1966 World Cup footballer.

Upper Second Class Honours 

The upper division is commonly abbreviated to '2:1" or 'II.i' (pronounced two-one).  The 2:1 is a minimum requirement for entry to many postgraduate courses in the UK.  It is also required for the award of a research council postgraduate studentship in the UK, although a combination of qualifications and experience equal to a 2:1 is also acceptable. This is often interpreted as
possession of a master's degree (sometimes at merit level or above) in addition to a 2:2 undergraduate degree.

The percentage of candidates who achieve Upper Second Class Honours can vary widely by degree subject, as well as by university.

A 2:1 degree is sometimes nicknamed an Attila the Hun (two-one) in the UK. The term Bren gun is also sometimes used as rhyming slang.

Lower Second Class honours
This is the lower division of Second Class degrees and is abbreviated as '2:2' or 'II.ii' (pronounced two-two). It is also informally known as a 'Desmond', named after Desmond Tutu.

Third Class honours

Third Class Honours, referred to as a "Third", is the lowest honours classification in most modern universities. Historically, the University of Oxford awarded Fourth Class Honours degrees and, until the late-1970s, did not distinguish between upper and lower Second Class Honours degrees.

Informally, the Third Class Honours degree is referred to as a "gentleman's degree" (cf. the "gentleman's C" in U.S. parlance) and in the UK as a Douglas Hurd (Third) after the 1980s Conservative politician of that name, who had actually graduated with a First Class Honours degree in history in 1952. 

Approximately 7.2% of students graduating in 2006 with an honours degree received a Third Class Honours degree.

Ordinary degree
While most university bachelor's degree courses lead to honours degrees, some universities offer courses leading to ordinary degrees. Some honours courses permit students who do not gain sufficient credits in a year by a small margin to transfer to a parallel ordinary degree course. Ordinary degrees may also sometimes be awarded to honours degree students who do not pass sufficient credits in their final year to gain an honours degree, but pass enough to earn an ordinary degree.

Some Scottish universities offer three-year ordinary degrees as a qualification in their own right, as well as an honours degree over four years. This is in contrast to English universities that have honours degrees with three years of study. An ordinary degree in Scotland is not a failed honours degree, as in certain English universities. Students can decide, usually at the end of their second or third year, whether or not they wish to complete a fourth honours year. Scottish universities may also award their ordinary degrees with distinction if a student achieves a particularly good grade average, usually 70% or above. A common example of a Scottish ordinary degree is the Bachelor of Laws course taken by graduates of other subjects, as this is sufficient (without honours) for entry into the legal profession.

Aegrotat
An aegrotat degree is an honours or ordinary degree without classification, awarded to a candidate who was unable to undertake their exams due to illness or even death, under the presumption that, had they completed those exams, they would have satisfied the standard required for that degree. Aegrotat degrees are often qualified with an appended '(aegrotat)'. Following the introduction of new regulations regarding mitigating circumstances, aegrotat degrees are less commonly awarded.

Inter doctrinae prioris

Degrees may be granted which incorporate prior learning, such as by means of CATS points transfer. Where the substance of incorporated credit exceeds a given threshold, the granting institution may be unable to grade sufficient work to award a degree classification. Any degree granted may then be unclassified.

Variations in classification

At the University of Cambridge, undergraduate Tripos examinations are split into one or more Parts, which span either one or two years. Each student receives a formal classification for each Part (i.e. Class I, II.i, II.ii, or III). Until October 2020, officially a grade simply existed for every Part of the degree, not for the overall degree. For students beginning their course of study from October 2020, a final class is awarded across the course of study, according to an algorithm determined by the Tripos.

At the University of Oxford, a formal degree Class is given, and this is typically based on the final examinations. In Oxford, examinations for Prelims or Honour Moderations are also undertaken in first/second year, but these results do not typically affect the final degree classification. Until the 1970s, the four honours divisions in Oxford's moderations and final examinations were named first, second, third and fourth class, but eventually Oxford gave in and adopted the numbering used by other English universities.

Variations of First Class honours

At the University of Cambridge, Triposes (undergraduate degree examinations) are split into one or more Parts. Attaining First Class Honours in two Parts culminates in graduating with a 'Double First'. It is possible in some Triposes to be awarded a 'Starred First', for examination scripts that "consistently exhibit the qualities of first class answers to an exceptional degree." Some Cambridge alumni who achieved Firsts in three Parts of the Tripos are described by their colleges and others as having achieved a 'Triple First'.

Oxford sometimes grants a congratulatory first, which The New York Times described as "a highly unusual honor in which the examining professors ask no questions about the candidate's written work but simply stand and applaud" and Martin Amis described as "the sort where you are called in for a viva and the examiners tell you how much they enjoyed reading your papers". A 'double first' at Oxford usually informally refers to First Class Honours in both components of an undergraduate degree, i.e., Moderations/Prelims and the Final Honours School, or in both the bachelor's and master's components of an integrated master's degree.

At University College London, candidates who perform well beyond the requirements of a standard First Class Honours may be nominated to the Dean's List. This is generated once per year and recognises outstanding academic achievement in final examinations. There are no set criteria for nomination to the list, but typically only a small number of students from each faculty are nominated per year. Comparable recognition in other anglophone countries is the award of a University Medal.

Degrees in the UK are mapped to levels of the Frameworks for Higher Education Qualifications of UK Degree-Awarding Bodies (FHEQ), which includes the Framework for Qualifications of Higher Education Institutes in Scotland (FQHEIS), which has an alternative numbering of levels corresponding to those of the Scottish Credit and Qualifications Framework (SCQF). Bachelor's degrees (including the Scottish MA, but not including medical degrees, dentistry degrees or degrees in veterinary science) attained in the UK are at FHEQ level 6/FQHEIS level 9 (ordinary) or 10 (honours); master's degrees (including integrated master's degrees and first degrees in medicine, dentistry and veterinary science) are at FHEQ level 7/FQHEIS level 11, and doctoral degrees are at FHEQ level 8/FQHEIS level 12. Bachelor's, master's and doctoral degrees map to first, second and third cycle qualifications in the Qualifications Framework of the European Higher Education Area.

International comparisons

Greece 
The table below depicts the Greek Grading system while illustrates approximately how the Grades are compared with ECTS and UK grades:

France 
The University of St Andrews gives equivalencies between French and British grades for its study-abroad programme. Equivalencies for the purposes of initial teacher training have also been derived by the UK NARIC for 1st, 2:1 and 2:2 degrees, which do not align with St Andrews' table.

South Africa
The South African Qualifications Authority (SAQA) compares international degrees with local degrees before any international student continues their studies in that country.  While the British degree accreditation and classification system allows students to go straight from a three-year bachelor's degree onto a master's degree (normally requiring a 1st or a 2:1 – those with a 2:2 or a 3rd usually require appropriate professional experience), South Africa does not do so unless the student has proven research capabilities.  South African Honours degrees prepare the students to undertake a research-specific degree (in terms of master's), by spending an in-depth year (up to five modules) creating research proposals and undertaking a research project of limited scope.  This prepares students for the research degrees later in their academic career.

Spain 
The UK NARIC has derived equivalencies for the grades of the Spanish grado and licenciatura degrees for purposes of initial teacher training bursaries.

The Netherlands
The Netherlands organisation for international cooperation in higher education (NUFFIC) has compared UK degree classification to Dutch degree grades. Dutch equivalencies have also been calculated by the UK NARIC.

NUFFIC also noted that the grading culture is different in the Netherlands, so that it is very rare for even the best students in the Netherlands to be awarded a 9 or a 10, which represent near perfection and absolute perfection.

United States

US comparison services treat English three-year bachelor's degrees and American four-year bachelor's degrees as equivalent. Some British sources, such as the Dearing Report, consider British honours degrees equivalent to a US master's degree and US bachelor's degrees as equivalent to British pass degrees in terms of the standard reached in the major subject, due to the higher degree of specialisation in the UK. However, British institutions generally accept US bachelor's degrees for admission to postgraduate study (see below).

In comparing US bachelor's degrees to British honours degrees, equivalencies can be expressed in terms of either US grade point averages (GPAs) or letter grades. British institutions normally state equivalence in terms of GPAs. Approximate mappings between British classifications and GPAs can be inferred from the graduate admissions criteria used by British universities, which often give international equivalents. For example, University College London (UCL) equates the minimum classification for entrance to GPAs using 2:1 = 3.3 and 2:2 = 3.0. Different universities convert grades differently: the London School of Economics and Political Science (LSE) considers a GPA of 3.5 or better as equivalent to gaining a 2:1, while the department of English Language and Literature at Oxford considers a GPA of "about 3.8" equivalent to a first class degree. Similarly, the UK NARIC gives equivalent GPAs for determining eligibility for teacher training bursaries. Durham University's North American Undergraduate Guide gives a conversion table as a guide to understanding British classifications (rather than for admission to postgraduate study) of 1st = 3.8–4.0, 2:1 = 3.3–3.7, 2:2 = 2.8–3.2 and 3rd = 2.3–2.7.
The GPA conversions are summarised in the following table:

Letter grade equivalents are more commonly used by American institutions. World Education Services (WES), a nonprofit organisation which provides qualification conversion services to many universities and employers, gives 1st = A, 2:1 = A−/B+, 2:2 = B, 3rd = B−, Pass = C. The Fulbright Commission has also created "an unofficial chart with approximate grade conversions between UK results and US GPA." The table below summarises these conversions, including GPA equivalents for the WES grades given using the letter grade to GPA conversion of Duke University.

Canada
Canadian academic grades may be given as letters, percentages, 12-point GPAs or 4-point GPAs. The 4-point GPAs are sometimes seen to differ from the US but other sources treat them as equivalent. The Durham conversion specifies GPAs for the US and letter grades/percentages for Canada while the UK NARIC has separate GPA conversions for the four-year bachelor's honours, baccalauréat and professional bachelor's degrees (which differ from their US GPA equivalents by at most 0.1) and the three-year bachelor's degree (which is seen as a lower standard). The British Graduate Admissions Fact Sheet from McGill University uses the conversion 1st = 4.0; 2:1 = 3.0; 2:2 = 2.7; 3rd = 2.0; Pass = 1.0; Fail = 0.0.

Progression to postgraduate study
Regulations governing the progression of undergraduate degree graduates to postgraduate programmes vary among universities, and are often flexible.  A candidate for a postgraduate master's degree is usually required to have at least a 2:1 (or 2:2 in some cases) bachelor honours degree, although candidates with firsts are in a considerably stronger position to gain a place in a postgraduate course and to obtain funding, especially in medical and natural sciences.  Some institutions specify a 2:1 minimum for certain types of master's program, such as for a Master of Research course.

Candidates with a Third or an Ordinary degree are sometimes accepted, provided they have acquired satisfactory professional experience subsequent to graduation. A candidate for a doctoral programme is nearly always required to have a first or 2:1 at bachelor's level.

Variations

International degrees

Australia
Some universities, such as those in Australia, offer ordinary or pass degrees (for instance, as a three-year B.A. or a three-year BSc) by default.  High-achieving students may be recognised with an honours classification without further coursework or research, as is often the case in engineering (which often contains a research and thesis component) or law. However, other courses (such as humanities, arts, social sciences, and sciences) and other universities may recognise high-achieving students with an honours classification with further coursework or research, undertaken either concurrently with, and as part of or in addition to, a bachelor's course, or after completion of a bachelor's course requirements and attaining adequately competitive grades.

Some graduate degrees have been or are classified; however, under the Australian Qualifications Framework (AQF), no graduate-level degrees (i.e., master's by coursework, master's by research, or higher research degrees) may be classified.  To comply with this standard, some institutions have commenced, or will commence, offering high-achieving graduates with "distinction". Notably, this is consistent with British graduate degree classification.

British medical and dental degrees
In the United Kingdom, medicine is usually taught as an undergraduate course, with graduates being awarded a master's level qualification: normally the conjoined degrees of Bachelor of Medicine, Bachelor of Surgery (MBBS, BM BCh, MB ChB, etc.) although at Queen's University Belfast (and universities in Ireland) Bachelor in the Art of Obstetrics (BAO) is added, and at some universities only the Bachelor of Medicine is awarded – all of these have equal standing. Unlike most undergraduate degrees, the MBBS is not normally considered an honours degree, and thus is not classified into first class honours, etc. Students may be awarded "Merits" and "Distinctions" for parts of the course or the whole course (depending on the institution) and "Honours" may be awarded at some institutions for exceptional performance throughout the course (as a grade above Distinction).

Medical schools split their year groups into 10 deciles.  These deciles are the major factor in the calculation of Educational Performance Measure (EPM) points used as part of medical students' Foundation Programme applications, with the top decile receiving 43 points, decreasing by a point for each decile (so the lowest gets 34 points); 7 points can be awarded for other educational achievements (other degrees and publications), and the EPM points are combined with up to 50 points from the Situational Judgement Test to give a total out of 100.

British grade point average
Following the recommendation of the Burgess report into the honours degree classification system in 2007, the Higher Education Academy ran a pilot in 2013–2014 in collaboration with 21 institutions delivering higher education (ranging from Russell Group universities to Further Education colleges) to investigate how a grade point average (GPA) system would work best in Britain. Two main weighting systems were tested: an American-style average of all marks, weighted only by credit value, and weighting by "exit velocity" in the manner of the honours classification, where modules in the first year are given a low or zero weight and modules in the final year have a higher weight (a third model was only rarely used). Over two-thirds of providers preferred exit-velocity weighting to the straight average.

A GPA scale, tied to percentage marks and letter grades, was recommended for use nationally following the study, to run in parallel with the honours degree classification system.

Nicknames
Based on colloquial rhyming slang, British undergraduate honours degree classifications have gained a number of more or less common nicknames, based on the names of various well-known current and historical figures. The following is a summary of these.

See also
 Latin honors

References

Bachelor's degrees
Undergraduate Degree Classification
Educational classification systems
Academic honours